She's the Sheriff is an American sitcom television series that aired in first-run syndication from September 19, 1987 to April 1, 1989. Produced by Lorimar Television, the series marked the return of Suzanne Somers to television for the first time since she left her role as Chrissy Snow on ABC's Three's Company in 1980.

In 2002, She's the Sheriff was ranked #44 on TV Guide's "50 Worst TV Shows of All Time".

Synopsis
Somers stars as Hildy Granger, a young woman whose husband, the sheriff of fictional Lakes County, Nevada (near Lake Tahoe), has died suddenly.  Now a widow with two children to support, Hildy accepts the county commissioner's offer to appoint her to serve as sheriff herself, despite her lack of relevant experience. The show focuses on her efforts to handle the daily problems of locals and tourists, while learning to work with her four deputies. In particular, Hildy has regular battles with Deputy Max Rubin, who thinks her undeserving of the job.

Cast and characters
 Suzanne Somers as Hildy Granger, the newly appointed Sheriff of Lakes County, Nevada
 George Wyner as Deputy Max Rubin, indignant that he has been passed over for the job of sheriff.
 Pat Carroll as Gussie Holt, Hildy's mother and a part-time writer.
 Lou Richards as Deputy Dennis Putnam, a naïve man who takes things too literally.
 Guich Koock as Deputy Hugh Mulcahy, a man admired for his intelligence.
 Leonard Lightfoot as Deputy Alvin Wiggins, who tries to be a voice of reason.
 Taliesin Jaffe as Hildy's son Kenny 
 Nicky Rose as Hildy's daughter Allison.

Episode list

Season 1: 1987–88

Season 2: 1988–89

Original pilot

The series had its origins in the 1982 CBS sitcom pilot Cass Malloy. Creators Dan Guntzelman and Steve Marshall pitched the format to CBS that later became the syndicated She's the Sheriff: that of a late sheriff's wife taking over her husband's job, and the challenges she faced as a woman in a male-oriented environment. Annie Potts was originally cast as the titular Cass Malloy, but she was soon dropped during development in favor of Caroline McWilliams, who was in search of a starring vehicle after leaving the hit ABC series Benson. The pilot was shot and greenlighted by CBS, and aired as a one-off on July 21, 1982. The pilot did not perform to CBS' expectations, and thus was not picked up as a series.

George Wyner and Lou Richards appeared in both Cass Malloy and She's the Sheriff, but in the CBS pilot, their characters' surnames were different. Wyner played Deputy Max Rosenkrantz, who had hoped to fill the shoes of deceased sheriff Big Jim Malloy, but who was now upset about being passed over in favor of Malloy's wife. Richards played Deputy Dennis Little in the pilot. The cast also featured Glynn Turman as officer Woodrow Freeman, a character that served as the basis for Leonard Lightfoot's Alvin Wiggins in She's the Sheriff; Dick Butkus as officer Alvin Dimsky; Murphy Dunne as Adam Barrett; and Dianne Kay (in her first project after Eight is Enough) as Tina Marie Nelson.

Sheriff Cass Malloy had three children in the original pilot: teenager Colleen (Amanda Wyss), preteen Nona (Heather Hobbs) and the youngest, "Little Big" Jim (Corey Feldman). While She's the Sheriff was set in Lakes County, Nevada, Cass Malloy was situated in Burr County, Indiana.

Guntzelman and Marshall would find success as producers a few years later with ABC's Growing Pains, which prompted them to revisit the Cass Malloy teleplay in hopes of finally getting it on the air as a series. Lorimar-Telepictures took an interest in a revised version of the script and greenlighted a series order in 1987 for the then-burgeoning first-run syndication market. Early in production, a two-page ad was placed in the January 5, 1987, issue of Broadcasting & Cable magazine listing the show under the working title Suddenly Sheriff and with Priscilla Barnes as the star (Barnes had been the second replacement for Suzanne Somers on Three's Company.) It is not known exactly when the show's name and casting were finalized.

Production
David Goldsmith and Arthur Silver were the executive producers, Marty Nadler was producer, Wenda Fong was co-producer and Lisa Lewis was associate producer.

Syndication
She's the Sheriff was part of NBC's much-hyped "Prime Time Begins at 7:30" campaign, in which the network's owned-and-operated stations would air first-run sitcoms in the 7:30-8 p.m. time slot to counter competing stations' game shows, sitcom reruns and other offerings. However, this experiment was short-lived, and although She's the Sheriff was renewed for a second season, it was moved to a weekend time slot.

References

External links 
 
 She's the Sheriff opening credits on YouTube
 Cass Malloy (pilot) opening credits on YouTube

1987 American television series debuts
1989 American television series endings
1980s American sitcoms
1980s American workplace comedy television series
English-language television shows
First-run syndicated television programs in the United States
Television shows set in Nevada
Television series by Lorimar Television
Television series by Lorimar-Telepictures